Aqchay or Aq Chay, also rendered as Agh Chay or Aqa Chay or Akchay or Aqchai, may refer to:
 Aqchay-e Olya, Ardabil Province
 Aqchay-e Sofla, Ardabil Province
 Aqchay-e Vosta, Ardabil Province
 Aq Chay, Hamadan Province